Scott Cohen is an American actor. He is known for his portrayal of Wolf in the 2000 NBC miniseries The 10th Kingdom, his performance as detective Steve Thomas in Perfect Murder, Perfect Town, his recurring role as Lorelai Gilmore's love interest Max Medina on the WB series Gilmore Girls, and his role as Josh in the indie romantic flick Kissing Jessica Stein.

Life and career

In 1990, Cohen was offered a breakthrough role in Adrian Lyne's Jacob's Ladder. In the video game Ripper, he portrays protagonist Jake Quinlan.  He appeared in the movie Gia with Angelina Jolie, as a parole officer in the Showtime original series Street Time with Rob Morrow, had a recurring role as Det. Harry Denby in the seventh season of NYPD Blue, and was featured in the 2005 NBC series Law & Order: Trial by Jury as Det. Chris Ravell.

In 2000 Cohen had a co-starring role as Wolf in the hit miniseries The 10th Kingdom, where he played a mythical character from a land of fairy tales. He starred opposite Kimberly Williams, John Larroquette, Dianne Wiest, Daniel Lapaine, Ed O'Neill, and Rutger Hauer. The miniseries won many awards, such as the 2000 Primetime Emmy Award for Outstanding Main Title Design.

Also in 2000 Cohen played Max Medina, in the hit TV series Gilmore Girls, as a teacher at Chilton high school where the main character's daughter went to school. Medina became the boyfriend of Lauren Graham's character, Lorelai, in season one and fiancé in season two.

In 2002–2003, he made some appearances on the game show Pyramid, hosted by Donny Osmond.  He guest-starred in the premiere episode of the eighth season of Law & Order: Criminal Intent, playing the role of a city politician with a dark family secret and whose daughter is a drug addict involved with a drug dealer boyfriend killed mysteriously in the opening scene.

Cohen played Jack Woolf in the movie The Other Woman with Natalie Portman and Charlie Tahan. He starred in the British thriller Iron Cross. In the film he plays Ronnie, whose father, Joseph, is played by Roy Scheider. Cohen was on USA Network's drama series Necessary Roughness as the fixer, Nico.

Cohen had a role in The Carrie Diaries as Carrie's dad's old friend starting in Season 1 Episode 3. He gives Carrie her internship at his law firm in New York City, and Carrie dates his son. He also courts and eventually marries Larissa, Carrie's boss at Interview magazine.

Cohen starred opposite Hope Davis in the NBC drama Allegiance.

Filmography

Film

Television

Videogames

References

External links
 
 
 

American male film actors
American male television actors
Living people
Place of birth missing (living people)
Year of birth missing (living people)